Brendan McCarthy is an American actor known for his roles in True Blood, Justified, Shooter, and others.

Background 
Born in Camp Pendleton, California, McCarthy attended Cathedral Catholic High School and earned a Bachelor of Science degree in business management from the University of San Diego. During college, McCarthy played on the San Diego Toreros baseball team. After graduating from college, he moved to Los Angeles and got his first role in 61*.

Filmography

Film

Television

References 

Living people
Male actors from San Diego
University of San Diego alumni
San Diego Toreros baseball players
Year of birth missing (living people)
American male film actors
American male television actors
21st-century American male actors